Harminder Singh (born 9 May 1984) is a retired Indian race walker.
He was disqualified at the 2009 Asian Championships, but placed sixth at the 2010 Asian Games and won the bronze medal at the 2010 Commonwealth Games, all in the 20 kilometre event. Balwinder Singh

References

1984 births
Living people
Indian male racewalkers
Athletes (track and field) at the 2010 Commonwealth Games
Athletes (track and field) at the 2010 Asian Games
Commonwealth Games medallists in athletics
Commonwealth Games bronze medallists for India
Place of birth missing (living people)
Asian Games competitors for India
Medallists at the 2010 Commonwealth Games